The 13th Parliament of Pakistan is the legislature of Pakistan following the 2008 general election of members of parliament (MPs) to the National Assembly of Pakistan, the lower house of the bicameral Majlis-e-Shura. The National Assembly is a democratically elected body consisting of 342 members, who are referred to as Members of the National Assembly (MNAs), of which 272 are directly elected members; 70 reserved seats for women and religious minorities are allocated to the political parties according to their proportion of the total vote.

Members

Former members

See also 

 List of members of the 1st National Assembly of Pakistan
 List of members of the 2nd National Assembly of Pakistan
 List of members of the 3rd National Assembly of Pakistan
 List of members of the 4th National Assembly of Pakistan
 List of members of the 5th National Assembly of Pakistan
 List of members of the 6th National Assembly of Pakistan
 List of members of the 7th National Assembly of Pakistan
 List of members of the 8th National Assembly of Pakistan
 List of members of the 9th National Assembly of Pakistan
 List of members of the 10th National Assembly of Pakistan
 List of members of the 11th National Assembly of Pakistan
 List of members of the 12th National Assembly of Pakistan
 List of members of the 13th National Assembly of Pakistan
 List of members of the 14th National Assembly of Pakistan
 List of members of the 15th National Assembly of Pakistan

References

External links
 National Assembly of Pakistan

 List
Lists of members of the National Assembly of Pakistan by term